Jarahi (also Romanized as Jarāḥī) is a village in Mahvelat-e Jonubi Rural District, in the Central District of Mahvelat County, Razavi Khorasan Province, Iran. At the 2006 census, its population was 17, in 4 families.

References 

Populated places in Mahvelat County